Deep Katdare (born July 4, 1970) is an American executive and former actor. He starred in and produced the movie American Desi (2001) and was in the cast of Hiding Divya (2006), on which he was an executive producer. He also appeared in several episodes of Law & Order: SVU. From 2004 to 2006, Katdare appeared in the Broadway production Bombay Dreams as Vikram, the show's villain. He currently works at The Related Companies as a Senior Vice President.

Early life and education
Katdare was born in Buffalo, New York. He grew up Chatham Township and was educated at the Delbarton School. He graduated from Massachusetts Institute of Technology (MIT) with a Bachelor of Science degree in political science.

Personal life
Katdare resides in New York City. He is married to Royal Pains actress Reshma Shetty, who starred with him in the national tour of Bombay Dreams in 2006. They married on March 19, 2011, and welcomed daughter Ariya Eliana on October 6, 2015.

Filmography

Film

Television

References

External links

1970 births
Living people
American people of Marathi descent
American male stage actors
American male film actors
American male actors of Indian descent
Delbarton School alumni
Male actors from Buffalo, New York
MIT School of Humanities, Arts, and Social Sciences alumni
People from Chatham Township, New Jersey
American financiers